Webb most often refers to James Webb Space Telescope which is named after James E. Webb, second Administrator of NASA.

It may also refer to:

Places

Antarctica
Webb Glacier (South Georgia)
Webb Glacier (Victoria Land)
Webb Névé, Victoria Land, the névé at the head of Seafarer Glacier
Webb Nunataks, a group of nunataks in the Neptune Range
Webb Peak (disambiguation)

Canada
 Rural Municipality of Webb No. 138, Saskatchewan
 Webb, Saskatchewan, a village within the rural municipality

United States
Webb, Alabama, a town
Webb, Iowa, a city
Webb Lake (Maine)
Webb River, Maine
Webb Memorial State Park, Massachusetts
Webb, Mississippi, a town
Webb City, Missouri, a city
Webb City, Oklahoma, a town
Webb, New York, a town
Webb, Texas, an unincorporated community
Webb County, Texas
Webb Air Force Base, near Big Spring, Texas
Webb Hill, Utah
Webb, West Virginia, an unincorporated community
Webb Canyon, Grand Teton National Park, Wyoming

The Moon
Webb (crater)

Things 

 CSS Webb, a Confederate States Navy steam ram in the American Civil War
 James Webb Space Telescope

Other uses
Webb (given name)
Webb (surname)
Webb Marlowe, pseudonym of J. Francis McComas
Webb Institute, Glen Cove, New York, US
Webb, a house of Adams' Grammar School, Newport, Shropshire, UK

See also
Justice Webb (disambiguation)
Jervis B. Webb Company
Mount Webb National Park, Queensland
Web (disambiguation)
Webb and Knapp, a development company
Webb House (disambiguation)
The Webb School (disambiguation)
Webb v. United States, a Supreme Court case
Webbe